Pleasant Grove Presbyterian Church is a historic building located in Chatham, Iowa, United States. The building's significance is associated with its architecture. The design of the wood frame structure is more reminiscent of a schoolhouse than a church building. There are no church buildings similar in style in the area. F. W. Chapman, of Waterloo, Iowa was responsible for the carpentry work, Tabor Construction Company poured the foundation, and Menzel, also of Waterloo, installed the windows. The windows incorporate the pointed Gothic arch. The building was constructed for $2,910.35.

Pleasant Grove Presbyterian was founded by the Rev. James S. Fullerton and Elder Vaughn of Marion, Iowa in 1853 before the villages of Chatham and Littleton were established. The congregation first met in a log schoolhouse. They moved to Chatham after its establishment in 1856. The Rev. John D. Caldwell was the first resident pastor. Initially, the Presbyterians shared the stone schoolhouse there with the Methodist congregation. Pleasant Grove built their first church in 1865. It was moved in 1907 to make room for the present church building. The congregation disbanded for lack of numbers in 2014. The building was listed on the National Register of Historic Places in 2017. It was donated to the Littleton and Chatham Historical Society for use as a museum and community building.

References

Religious organizations established in 1853
Churches completed in 1907
Presbyterian churches in Iowa
Former Presbyterian churches in the United States
Buildings and structures in Buchanan County, Iowa
National Register of Historic Places in Buchanan County, Iowa
Churches on the National Register of Historic Places in Iowa